Leprolochus is a genus of spiders in the family Zodariidae. It was first described in 1893 by Simon. , it contains 7 South American species.

Species
Leprolochus comprises the following species:
 L. birabeni Mello-Leitão, 1942 — Brazil, Paraguay, Argentina
 L. levergere Lise, 1994 — Brazil
 L. mucuge Lise, 1994 — Brazil
 L. oeiras Lise, 1994 — Brazil
 L. parahybae Mello-Leitão, 1917 — Brazil
 L. spinifrons Simon, 1893 (type) — Panama to Venezuela
 L. stratus Jocqué & Platnick, 1990 — Venezuela

References

Zodariidae
Araneomorphae genera
Spiders of South America